Federal elections were held in Switzerland on 31 October 1971. Although the Social Democratic Party received the most votes, the Free Democratic Party emerged as the largest party in the National Council, winning 49 of the 200 seats. They were the first federal elections in which women were allowed to vote, following a referendum earlier in the year that introduced universal suffrage for federal elections.

Results

National Council

By constituency

Council of the States

References

Switzerland
1971 in Switzerland
Federal elections in Switzerland
October 1971 events in Europe
Federal